Chilakaluripet mandal (officially Chilakaluripet H/O Purshothama Patnam) is one of the 28 mandals in Palnadu district of the Indian state of Andhra Pradesh. It is under the administration of Narasaraopet revenue division and the headquarters are located at Chilakaluripet city. The mandal is bounded by Nadendla, Edlapadu, Pedanandipadu and Narasaraopet mandals.

Administration 

The Mandal is under the control of a Tahsildar and the present tahsildar is P.Ch. Venkaiah. Chilakaluripet mandal is one of the 3 mandals under Chilakaluripet (Assembly constituency), which in turn represents Narasaraopet (Lok Sabha constituency) of Andhra Pradesh.

Towns and villages 

 census, the mandal has 15 settlements. It includes 1 town and 15 villages. Chilakaluripet is a hamlet of Purshothama Patnam.

The settlements in the mandal are listed below:

Note: M-Municipality

See also 
 List of mandals in Andhra Pradesh
 Villages in Chilakaluripet mandal

References

Mandals in Andhra Pradesh
Palnadu district